Hari Teja is an Indian actress and television presenter, who works in Telugu-language films and television. She is also a professional Kuchipudi dancer. She contested on the reality TV show Bigg Boss 1, and stood in third place.

Early and personal life 
Hari Teja was born on 24 February 1992 to a Marathi father and Kannada mother in Tirupathi, Andhra Pradesh, India. Her father is a BSNL employee.

She has been trained in Kuchipudi dance and singing from childhood. After completing her schooling and graduation, she chose media as a career. She is married to Deepak.

Career 
Teja started her career in Telugu TV serials and by anchoring TV shows. She featured in some of the prominent TV serials like Manasu Mamatha and Muthyamantha Pasupu. She was anchor of the ETV Telugu cookery show Abhiruchi. She later acted in Telugu films including A Aa, Dikkulu Choodaku Ramayya, Andari Bandhuvaya, Dammu, Duvvada Jagannadham, Anaganaga O Dheerudu, Winner, Attarintiki Daredi, Ungarala Rambabu, and Raja the Great. Her role as Mangamma in A Aa directed by Trivikram Srinivas bought her more audience notice and fame.

Bigg Boss

She was one of the 16 participants on Season 1 of the Bigg Boss Telugu game show on Star Maa television, and reached the final week for the title. She finished the show at 3rd place.

Television

Filmography
All films are in Telugu, unless otherwise noted.

References

External links
 Hari Teja Biography | Bigg Boss Telugu

1989 births
Living people
Telugu actresses
People from Tirupati
Bigg Boss (Telugu TV series) contestants